Sociedad Deportiva Retuerto Sport is a football team based in Barakaldo in the autonomous community of Basque Country. Founded in 1923, the team plays in Tercera División. The club's home ground is Ibarreta, which has a capacity of 822 spectators.

Season to season

2 seasons in Tercera División

References

External links
Official website
Retuerto Sport news
Territorial Preferente

Football clubs in the Basque Country (autonomous community)
Association football clubs established in 1923
Divisiones Regionales de Fútbol clubs
1923 establishments in Spain
Barakaldo